Cabezón de Cameros, a municipality in La Rioja, Spain, with a population of only 24 (2005), is one of the 10 least populated municipalities in this region, and one of the 100 least populated of Spain, as a whole. In 2001, the population was 21, and in 1991, 32. Cabezón de Cameros ranks fourth in Spain with respect to the male:female population ratio (19:5). Its surface is 12 km² and its population density, 1,75 p/km². Its geographic coordinates are: latitude, 42° 11'  N, longitude:   2° 31'  W, altitude: 923 meters. The distance from Logroño, the regional capital, is 43 kilometers.

The mayor of Cabezón de Cameros is Mr. Valentín Gerardo Aragón Blanco, of the Partido Popular. In the 2004 Spanish General Election the Partido Socialista Obrero Español got 80.0% (16 votes) in Cabezón de Cameros, the Partido Popular got 15.0% of the vote (3 votes), and Izquierda Unida, got 5.0% (1 vote).

References

Municipalities in La Rioja (Spain)